Mathilde Emma Halse (born 2 May 1999) is a Danish curler from Gentofte. She competed in the 2018 Winter Olympics. She currently plays third on the Danish National Women's Curling Team skipped by Madeleine Dupont.

Career
Halse became the skip of the Danish National Junior Women's Curling Team in 2019, where she skipped the team at the 2019 World Junior-B Curling Championships (January). They lost in the quarterfinals and would not qualify for the World Juniors. Later that year, she became the skip of the National Women's Team and represented Denmark at the 2019 European Curling Championships, where they went 2–7. This qualified them for the 2020 World Women's Curling Championship, which was cancelled due to the COVID-19 pandemic. At the 2019 World Junior-B Curling Championships (December), the team was successful in qualifying for the 2020 World Junior Curling Championships in Krasnoyarsk, Russia where they went 4–5.

Halse competed at the 2021 World Women's Curling Championship as third for the Danish team skipped by Madeleine Dupont. The event was played in a bio-secure "bubble" to prevent the spread of the virus. The Danish team qualified for the playoffs for the first time since 2011, finishing the round robin with an 8–5 record. They then lost in the qualification game to the United States, skipped by Tabitha Peterson 8–7.

Personal life
As of 2020, Halse is a physiotherapy student.

References

External links

1999 births
Living people
Curlers at the 2018 Winter Olympics
Danish female curlers
Olympic curlers of Denmark
People from Nuuk
People from Gentofte Municipality
Greenlandic sportswomen
Curlers at the 2022 Winter Olympics
Sportspeople from the Capital Region of Denmark
21st-century Danish women